

Empress and Despoina in Cyprus
Byzantine titles did not have any territorial qualification, so there were no Emperors or Despots of Cyprus

Komnenoi dynasty, 1184–1191

Consort of Cyprus

House of Lusignan, 1192–1489

Titular consort of Cyprus

House of Lusignan, 1464–1485

House of Savoy, 1485–1490

Line of Philip II of Savoy, since 1490
This line of succession followed the Salic succession of the House of Savoy.

Line of Yolande Louise of Savoy, since 1490
This line of succession followed the primogeniture law of that existed in the Kingdoms of Cyprus, Armenia, and Jerusalem.

House of Brienne, since 1490This line of succession followed the primogeniture law of that existed in the Kingdoms of Cyprus and Jerusalem, which was overruled by the Haute Cour.

See also
List of Latin Empresses
Princess of Antioch

Notes

Sources
CYPRUS

Cyprus
 
House of Lusignan
Cyprus
Royal consorts